Grayson Cleophas Shillingford (25 September 1944 – 23 December 2009) was a West Indian cricketer who played in seven Test matches from 1969 to 1972. His cousin Irvine Shillingford also played Test cricket for the West Indies.

Grayson Shillingford attended Dominica Grammar School in Roseau. He was a right-arm fast bowler who played for Windward Islands from 1967–68 to 1978–79. He toured England with the West Indies team in 1969 and 1973. His best first-class figures were 6 for 49 for the Combined Windward and Leeward Islands team against Trinidad in 1971–72.

He received Dominica's Sisserou Award of Honour in 2009. He moved to Canada after his cricket career ended and lived in Toronto for 24 years.

The Grayson Shillingford Stands are named in his honour at Windsor Park (Dominica).

References

External links

 Shillingford was first Dominican to play for West Indies

1944 births
2009 deaths
West Indies Test cricketers
People from Saint Joseph Parish, Dominica
Combined Islands cricketers
Windward Islands cricketers
Dominica cricketers